True & Co. is an American online lingerie startup, headquartered in San Francisco, California.

History
True & Co. was founded by Michelle Lam and initially Aarthi Ramamurthy.  After the early departure of Ramamurthy due to infighting, New York based Dan Dolgin was hired and given the title of Co-founder. Dolgin has since left the company. A new co-founder was named in 2016, the fourth for True & Co., with operations executive Beatrice Pang given the title. She is formerly of Microsoft Corporation. Lam founded the company after becoming frustrated with trying on bras in fitting rooms.

In March 2017, True & Co. was acquired by PVH, and was integrated into the Heritage Brands division alongside intimate apparel brands Warner's and Olga, sportswear brand Izod, and dress/casualwear brands Van Heusen, Arrow, and Geoffrey Beene.

Service
The company uses a questionnaire and associated algorithm to recommend bra sizes to customers. According to the New York Times, the company's concept allows customers to "choose what fits best." True & Co. sells bras from other lingerie lines as well as from its own branded collection.

True & Co. released a beta version in January 2012 and officially launched in May 2012. According to Bloomberg Businessweek, "True & Co. is often referred to as 'the Netflix of bras.'" In May 2016, the company launched a "Try-On Truck", a mobile lingerie fitting room which has since ended.

References

Further reading
 

Online clothing retailers of the United States
Companies based in San Francisco
2012 establishments in California
American companies established in 2012
Clothing companies established in 2012
Retail companies established in 2012
Internet properties established in 2012
Lingerie retailers
Lingerie brands
PVH (company) clothing brands
2012 establishments in the United States